Pedro Pais de Almeida is a lawyer and past president of the Union Internationale des Avocats. 

He is the current president of FALP - Federação dos Advogados de Língua Portuguesa (Federation of Portuguese Language Lawyers).

He graduated with a degree in law in 1990 at the  Universidade Lusíada de Lisboa. In 1991, at the Lisbon Higher Institute of Management, he completed the General Course of Management in 1996, at the same institution and he finished his postgraduate course in taxation. He is an Attorney Specialist in Tax Law assigned by the Portuguese Bar Association. 
He was awarded the Medal of Honor from the Portuguese Bar Association on May 19, 2019. On February 15, 2019, he was awarded a Medal from the Bar Association of Barcelona.

External links
https://www.linkedin.com/in/pedropaisalmeida/

Career 
Partner with Abreu Advogados since 2008.

Founding Partner of PACSA – Henriques da Silva, Pais de Almeida, Corrêa de Sampaio & Associados, Sociedade de Advogados RL (1996 - 2008).

President of Union Internationale des Avocats (UIA) from October 30, 2017 to November 2, 2018.

Elected President of Union Internationale des Avocats (UIA) (November 2016 until November 2017).

Vice-president of Union Internationale des Avocats (Union Internationale des Avocats) (2015-2016).

Member of UIA since 1995, where performed several positions: Director of Commissions of UIA (2010-2011); UIA Representative in International Legal Assistance Consortium (ILAC), since 2009; President of the Foreign Investments Commission of UIA (2006-2011); Vice-president of the Foreign Investments Commission of UIA (2004-2006).

Member of the Executive Committee and Portuguese Chapter Chair of the International Section of the New York State Bar Association (NYSBA), since 2006.

Chairman of the Advisory Board of Consulegis, EEIG (2013-2015).

Member of the Supervisory Board of IES – Instituto de Empreendorismo Social (Corporate social responsibility), since 2014.

President the Supervisory Board of IES, since July 2017.

Tax Arbitrator with CAAD – Centro de Arbitragem Administrativa (Centre of Administrative Arbitration), since 2011.

Board Member of APCF – Associação Portuguesa de Consultores Fiscais (Portuguese Association of Tax Consultants), having been Founding Member in 2011.

Chairman of the Supervisory Board (1998-2002) and Chairman of the Board of Directors (2003-2009) of a major Portuguese Charity entity for Homeless, CAIS – Associação de Solidariedade Social.

Candidate, as part of the list of MEP – Movimento Esperança Portugal, a Portuguese political party, in the European Parliament Elections (2009).

Author of several articles, publications and studies in the areas of Tax Law and other matters, and speaker at several conferences and courses.

References

Living people
20th-century Portuguese lawyers
Union Internationale des Avocats
Year of birth missing (living people)
21st-century Portuguese lawyers